Mama Weed is a 2020 French crime comedy film directed by Jean-Paul Salomé from a screenplay he co-wrote with Hannelore Cayre, and in collaboration with his son Antoine Salomé. The film is based on Cayre's 2017 novel The Godmother. It stars Isabelle Huppert. It had its world premiere at the L'Alpe d'Huez Film Festival on 16 January 2020. It was released in France on 9 September 2020.

Synopsis
Patience Portefeux is an Arabic–French translator for a French police precinct's narcotics unit. When she discover she knows the mother of one of the drug dealers, Patience decides to use her insider knowledge to protect her friend and gets herself deeper involved in the world of drug dealing.

Cast

Release
Mama Weed had its world premiere at the L'Alpe d'Huez Film Festival on 16 January 2020. The film was originally scheduled to be released theatrically on 25 March 2020 but was postponed due to the French government's decision to close cinemas in response to the COVID-19 pandemic. It was finally released in France by Le Pacte on 9 September 2020. Music Box Films gave the film a limited theatrical release in the United States beginning on 16 July 2021.

Reception

Critical response
On Rotten Tomatoes, the film holds an approval rating of 79% based on 39 reviews, with an average rating of 6.8/10. The website's consensus reads, "Mama Weed fails to fully engage with its themes -- but that's a relatively small quibble with Isabelle Huppert in the central role." According to Metacritic, which assigned a weighted average score of 58 out of 100 based on 9 critics, the film received "generally favorable reviews".

Nathalie Simon of Le Figaro wrote, "Jean-Paul Salomé's comedy about drug trafficking skillfully mixes the policier genre and humour".

Jordan Mintzer of The Hollywood Reporter called it "cleverly conceived and amusingly performed, if never quite as funny as it could be".

Awards and nominations

References

External links
 

2020 films
2020 comedy films
2020 crime films
2020s French films
2020s French-language films
2020s crime comedy films
Films about the illegal drug trade
Films directed by Jean-Paul Salomé
French crime comedy films
French films based on novels
Films based on French novels
Films scored by Bruno Coulais
French films about cannabis
Films postponed due to the COVID-19 pandemic
Works about cannabis trafficking